The 2017–18 San Diego State Aztecs women's basketball team represents San Diego State University in the 2017–18 NCAA Division I women's basketball season. The Aztecs, led by fifth year head coach Stacie Terry, play their home games at the Viejas Arena as members of the Mountain West Conference. They finished the season 11–19, 5–13 in Mountain West play to finish in a three way tie for eighth place. They lost in the first round of the Mountain West women's tournament to Nevada.

Roster

Schedule

|-
!colspan=9 style=| Exhibition

|-
!colspan=9 style=| Non-conference regular season

|-
!colspan=9 style=| Mountain West regular season

|-
!colspan=9 style=| Mountain West Women's Tournament

See also
2017–18 San Diego State Aztecs men's basketball team

References

San Diego State
San Diego State Aztecs women's basketball seasons
San Diego State
San Diego State